Voices of Change is a professional chamber music ensemble based in Dallas, United States.  Voices of Change performs small ensemble works by 20th- and 21st–century composers.

History
Voices of Change was founded in 1974 by pianist Jo Boatright and clarinetist Ross Powell. In 1999, VOC was nominated as a finalist for a Grammy Award for Best Performance by a Small Classical Ensemble. The CD, Voces Americanas, features works of five living composers of Hispanic descent.  Voices of Change has been awarded the annual ASCAP Award for Adventuresome Programming an unprecedented five times and has recorded LPs and CDs on the CRI, Crystal, Innova, Albany, Centaur, and Redwood labels.

The ensemble has hosted more than 87 composers who have come to hear, discuss, and participate in the performance of their pieces. It has presented over 60 world premieres (more than 25 of which were commissioned by the ensemble), performed music by over 300 composers, and recorded 5 CDs. Voices of Change also commissions and records new works and produces an annual modern music competition to introduce the music of new composers.

Members
 Maria Schleuning, Artistic Director
 Virginia Dupuy, Soprano
 Helen Blackburn, Flute
 Paul Garner, Clarinet
 Drew Lang, Percussion
 Maria Schleuning, Violin
 Kari Kettering, cello
 Liudmila Georgievskaya, piano.

Previous Artistic Directors:
 Jo Boatright, Founding Artistic Director
 Shields Collins (Buddy) Bray
 Joe Illick

Discography

 2003. dancesing in a green bay (Music of David Dzubay)
 2001. Mythologies (Music of Harold Blumenfeld) 
 2000. Music by Donald Grantham 
 1999. Tango/Frida (Music of Robert Xavier Rodriguez)
 1998. Voces Americanas (Music of Robert Xavier Rodriguez, Mario Lavista, Roberto Sierra, Mario Davidovsky, Tania León)
 1991. American Contemporary (Music of William Kraft, Larry Alan Smith, Dan Welcher, Robert Xavier Rodriguez)

External links
 Voices of Change website

Contemporary classical music ensembles
Musical groups established in 1974
1974 establishments in Texas
Musical groups from Dallas
Texas classical music